Admiral of the Fleet Sir David Benjamin Bathurst,  (born 27 May 1936) is a former Royal Navy officer. After training as a pilot and qualifying as a helicopter instructor, Bathurst commanded a Naval Air Squadron and then two frigates before achieving higher command in the Navy. He served as First Sea Lord and Chief of the Naval Staff from 1993 to 1995: in that capacity he advised the British Government on the deployment of Naval Support including Sea Harriers during the Bosnian War.

Early life
Bathurst is the son of Peter Bathurst and his wife Lady Elizabeth Ann Bathurst (née Temple-Gore-Langton). Generally known by his middle name of Benjamin, Bathurst was educated at Eton and Britannia Royal Naval College, Dartmouth.

Naval career
Bathurst joined the Royal Navy as a cadet in 1953 and became a midshipman on 1 September 1955. During his early career he served in the minesweeper  and, following promotion to sub-lieutenant on 1 January 1957 and to lieutenant on 1 February 1959, he qualified as a pilot in 1960. He next served in the ship's flight on the destroyer  and then qualified as a helicopter instructor in 1964. He served as an exchange officer with the Royal Australian Navy in 1965 and, following promotion to lieutenant commander on 1 February 1967, he became senior pilot of 820 Naval Air Squadron on the aircraft carrier . He was given command of 819 Naval Air Squadron in February 1969 and then joined the Directorate of Naval Recruiting at the Ministry of Defence in early 1970. Promoted to commander on 30 June 1970, he became executive officer on the destroyer  in February 1971. He joined the Directorate of Naval Air Warfare at the Ministry of Defence in February 1973.

He attended the Royal College of Defence Studies in 1981 and became Director of Naval Air Warfare at the Ministry of Defence in January 1982.

Promoted to rear admiral on 10 October 1983, on appointment as Flag Officer, Second Flotilla, Bathurst went on to be Director-General, Naval Manpower and Training at the Ministry of Defence in May 1985. He was promoted to vice admiral on 22 December 1986, on appointment as Chief of Fleet Support. He was appointed a Knight Commander of the Order of the Bath in the 1987 Birthday Honours, and promoted to full admiral on 21 April 1989, on appointment as Commander-in-Chief Fleet which also carried with it the NATO appointments of Commander-in-Chief, Channel and Commander-in-Chief, Eastern Atlantic. Advanced to Knight Grand Cross of the Order of the Bath in the 1991 New Year Honours, he became Vice-Chief of the Defence Staff in March 1991 and First Sea Lord and Chief of Naval Staff in March 1993. As First Sea Lord he advised the British Government on the deployment of Naval Support including Sea Harriers during the Bosnian War. He was promoted Admiral of the Fleet on 10 July 1995 on his retirement.

Later career
In retirement Bathurst became a Non-Executive Director of British International Helicopters. He was appointed a Deputy Lieutenant of Somerset on 27 August 1996 and became Vice-Lord Lieutenant on 18 February 1999. He is a younger brother of Trinity House and a Liveryman of Guild of Air Pilots and Air Navigators. His interests include gardening, shooting and fishing.

Family
Bathurst married Sarah Christian Pandora Peto, daughter of Major John Peto and granddaughter of Sir Basil Peto, 1st Baronet, in 1959. They have one son, Lieutenant General Sir Benjamin Bathurst, and three daughters.

References

Sources

External links
 Imperial War Museum Interview

|-

|-

|-

People educated at Eton College
Graduates of Britannia Royal Naval College
First Sea Lords and Chiefs of the Naval Staff
Royal Navy admirals of the fleet
Fleet Air Arm aviators
Knights Grand Cross of the Order of the Bath
1936 births
Living people
Graduates of the Royal College of Defence Studies
Deputy Lieutenants of Somerset
Benjamin
Members of Trinity House